TD SYNNEX is an American IT distribution company with a workforce of 22,000 in over 100 countries. On September 1, 2021, Tech Data completed a merger with Synnex creating TD SYNNEX, a new company with $59.8 billion in revenue. Through the combination of both companies, TD SYNNEX becomes the largest IT distributor, surpassing Ingram Micro. TD SYNNEX is led by former Tech Data CEO, Rich Hume.

Ownership 
At closing former Synnex shareholders owned 55% of TD SYNNEX while Apollo Global Management, the previous owner of Tech Data, owned 45%.

Revenue 
With the merger of Tech Data and Synnex, TD SYNNEX becomes the largest IT distributor having a combined revenue of $59.8 billion, which surpasses Ingram Micro, whose 2020 revenue was $49.1 billion. On January 11, 2022, TD SYNNEX reported the results of the first full quarter following the merger. TD SYNNEX reported fiscal year 2021 fourth quarter revenue of $15.61 billion.

Leadership 
Rich Hume, former CEO of Tech Data, is CEO of TD SYNNEX. Former Synnex president and CEO, Dennis Polk, serves as TD SYNNEX’s executive chair of the board of directors.

References 

American companies established in 2021
Companies listed on the New York Stock Exchange